Ognjen Vranješ (born 24 October 1989) is a Bosnian professional footballer who plays as a centre-back for Süper Lig club Hatayspor.

Vranješ started his professional career at Borac Banja Luka, before joining Red Star Belgrade in 2009. He was sent on loan to Napredak Kruševac in 2010 and to Sheriff Tiraspol later that year. Vranješ then played in Russia for Krasnodar and Spartak Vladikavkaz and in Turkey for Elazığspor and Gaziantepspor. He signed with Sporting Gijón in 2016. Later that year, he switched to Tom Tomsk. A year later, he moved to AEK Athens. The following year, Vranješ was transferred to Anderlecht, who loaned him back to AEK Athens in 2019 and to Charleroi in 2021. Later that year, he went back to AEK Athens. In 2022, he joined Hatayspor.

A former youth international for Bosnia and Herzegovina, Vranješ made his senior international debut in 2010, earning over 30 caps until 2018. He represented the nation at their first major championship, the 2014 FIFA World Cup.

Club career

Early career
Vranješ came through youth academy of his hometown club Borac Banja Luka, which he joined in 2000. He made his professional debut in 2007 at the age of 17. On 9 August 2008, he scored his first professional goal against Orašje, which secured the victory for his team.

In December, he signed with Serbian side Red Star Belgrade. In January 2010, he was sent on a six-month loan to Napredak Kruševac. In July, he was loaned to Moldovan team Sheriff Tiraspol until the end of season.

In January 2011, Vranješ moved to Russian club Krasnodar.

In December 2012, he joined Spartak Vladikavkaz. In May 2013, he suffered a severe knee injury, which was diagnosed as anterior cruciate ligament tear and was ruled out for at least six months.

In January 2014, he went to Turkish club Elazığspor.

In February 2015, he switched to Gaziantepspor.

In January 2016, Vranješ joined Spanish outfit Sporting Gijón.

In August, he signed with Tom Tomsk.

AEK Athens
In December, Vranješ moved to Greek side AEK Athens on a contract until June 2019. He was sent off on his official debut for the team on 7 January against Asteras. On 5 February, he scored his first goal for AEK Athens in a triumph over Veria.

Vranješ scored his first career hat-trick in a defeat of Xanthi on 18 February 2018.

He won his first trophy with the club on 23 April, when they were crowned league champions.

Anderlecht
In June, Vranješ was transferred to Belgian team Anderlecht for an undisclosed fee. He made his competitive debut for the club on 28 July against Kortrijk and scored an own goal.

In June 2019, he was sent on a season-long loan to his former club AEK Athens.

In January 2021, he was loaned to Charleroi for the remainder of campaign.

Return to AEK Athens
In July, Vranješ returned to AEK Athens on a two-year deal. He played his first official game for the team since coming back in UEFA Europa Conference League qualifier against Velež on 29 July. Six weeks later, he appeared in his first league game after returning against Ionikos. On 3 October, he scored first goal for AEK Athens since his comeback in a defeat of Panetolikos.

Later stage of career
In July 2022, Vranješ signed with Hatayspor.

International career
Vranješ was a member of Bosnia and Herzegovina under-21 team for several years.

In August 2010, he received his first senior call-up, for UEFA Euro 2012 qualifiers against Luxembourg and France, but had to wait until 17 November to make his debut in a friendly game against Slovakia.

In June 2014, Vranješ was named in Bosnia and Herzegovina's squad for 2014 FIFA World Cup, country's first major competition. He made his tournament debut in the last group match against Iran on 25 June.

In February 2019, national team coach Robert Prosinečki stated that he would no longer call Vranješ up due to many controversies he was involved in the past period, thus ending his international career.

Personal life
Vranješ's older brother Stojan is also a professional footballer.

He has been the subject of many controversies during his career. In August 2010, he wore Delije shirt to celebrate his then club Sheriff Tiraspol eliminating Dinamo Zagreb in UEFA Champions League qualifier, which was construed as provocation. In 2015, he made a tattoo depicting borders of Republika Srpska on his left upper arm, which led to public scrutiny. He later apologized and covered the tattoo up. Because of the tattoo, he had many altercations with BHFanaticos, the largest Bosnian support group. In September 2018, he was sentenced to eight months probation for instigating fan violence over his Facebook page during his time with AEK Athens. Later that year, it was spotted that Vranješ had a tattoo of Chetnik duke Momčilo Đujić on his upper right arm, which got him publicly criticized by Bosnian FA and the fans, with whom he already had bad relations. In January 2019, he was once again in center of a scandal, as media reported that he had an affair with Serbian singer Jelena Karleuša, who is married to footballer Duško Tošić. In January 2023, he, along with his brother, was found guilty of battering a couple and fined 6.000 BAM.

Career statistics

Club

International

Honours
Borac Banja Luka
First League of RS: 2007–08

AEK Athens
Super League Greece: 2017–18

References

External links

1989 births
Living people
Sportspeople from Banja Luka
Serbs of Bosnia and Herzegovina
Bosnia and Herzegovina footballers
Bosnia and Herzegovina under-21 international footballers
Bosnia and Herzegovina international footballers
Bosnia and Herzegovina expatriate footballers
Association football central defenders
FK Borac Banja Luka players
Red Star Belgrade footballers
FK Napredak Kruševac players
FC Sheriff Tiraspol players
FC Krasnodar players
FC Spartak Vladikavkaz players
Elazığspor footballers
Gaziantepspor footballers
Sporting de Gijón players
FC Tom Tomsk players
AEK Athens F.C. players
R.S.C. Anderlecht players
R. Charleroi S.C. players
Hatayspor footballers
First League of the Republika Srpska players
Premier League of Bosnia and Herzegovina players
Serbian SuperLiga players
Moldovan Super Liga players
Russian Premier League players
Süper Lig players
La Liga players
Super League Greece players
Belgian Pro League players
Expatriate footballers in Serbia
Expatriate footballers in Moldova
Expatriate footballers in Russia
Expatriate footballers in Turkey
Expatriate footballers in Spain
Expatriate footballers in Greece
Expatriate footballers in Belgium
Bosnia and Herzegovina expatriate sportspeople in Serbia
Bosnia and Herzegovina expatriate sportspeople in Moldova
Bosnia and Herzegovina expatriate sportspeople in Russia
Bosnia and Herzegovina expatriate sportspeople in Turkey
Bosnia and Herzegovina expatriate sportspeople in Spain
Bosnia and Herzegovina expatriate sportspeople in Greece
Bosnia and Herzegovina expatriate sportspeople in Belgium
2014 FIFA World Cup players